Kelakam is a small town and Grama Panchayat located in the south eastern part of Kannur district in Kerala state, India.

Demographics
As of 2011 Census, Kelakam had a population of 16,211 of which 7,979 are males and 8,232 are females. The sex ratio of Kelakam was 1,032 lower than state average of 1,084. Population of children in the age group 0-6 was 1,610 (9.9%) where 823 are males and 787 are females. Kelakam had an overall literacy of 94.6% higher than state average of 94%. The male literacy stands at 95.7% and female literacy was 93.6%.

Geography
It is a small town located in hilly regions of the western slope of western ghats. The Bavali River runs through the town, and the Kottiyoor Vadakkeshwaram Temple is seven kilometers away. It is situated near Aralam Wildlife Sanctuary which is ten kilometers away.

Etymology
Kelakam got its name from words "kela" "kam" meaning resting place of "bullock" referring to resting place of the bullock of Lord Shiva. It is in the Christian migration belt but different religious groups live harmoniously. The town is known for its hill produce including pepper, rubber, tapioca, and coconut. The land around Kelakam is fertile and is preferred for farming. The town is a centre for textiles and jewelry shops.

Tourism
Kelakam town, fast growing, beautiful, serene place in the Kannur district of Kerala. The people are very friendly and peacefully co-existing for about 60–70 years, the time when it started to grow due to the migration of people from the Travancore (South) side of Kerala. It is a centre of Hill-produce, Textiles shops and Jewellery shops. Not many places will be there in Kerala where there are so much Christian churches of various denominations. 
Long back Father Vadakkan observed fasting for farmers in Kelakam.

Transportation
Kerala State Hill highway (SH 59) passes through Kelakam town. The National Highway (NH 66) passes through Thalassery town on the west.  Mangalore and Mumbai can be accessed on the northern side and Cochin and Thiruvananthapuram can be accessed on the southern side.  The road to the east of Kelakam connects to Mysore and Bangalore through Mananthavadi route.   The nearest railway station is Thalassery on Mangalore-Palakkad line. The nearest airport is Kannur International Airport which is 40 kilometers away from Kelakam.

Educational institutions
St.Thomas Higher Secondary school
Little flower English high School
MGM(Mar Gregorio's Memorial) high school
St.Joseph's high school Adakathode
Manjalapuram UP school
Chettiyamparambu school
Providence L P School Velloonni
St. Mark L P School Chungakkunnu
Govt.U.P School Adakkathode
Govt.LP School Shantigiri

Religious places 

 St. Thomas Orthodox Salem Church Kelakam
 
 San Jos Syro Malabar church kelakam (St.Joseph's church)
 Sree Murchilakattu Maha Devi temple Kelakam
 St. George Orthodox Valiyapalli kelakam
 Little Flower Malankara Catholic Church Kelakam
 Immanuel Marthoma Church Kelakam
 Indian Pentecostal Church of God, Kelakam
 Assemblies of God church(Pentecostal church), Kanichar
 The Pentecostal Mission Church, Kelakam
 St. Mary's & St. Thomas Jacobite Syrian Sunoro Church Kelakam
 St. Joseph's church Adakkathode
 St. George Malankara catholic church Adakkathode
 Sree Palliyara mahadevi temple Adakkathode
 St. Mary's Orthodox Church Chettiyamparamba
 St. John the Baptist's Church Chettiyamparamba
 Providence church velloonny
 St. Antony's Church Manjalampuram
 Fathima Matha Forane church Chungakkunnu

Gallery

References

Villages near Iritty